Stevan Pavlović (16 May 1926 – 30 July 1998) was a Serbian long-distance runner who competed for SFR Yugoslavia in the 1952 Summer Olympics.

He was a member of AK Partizan Belgrade.

References
 at Sports-Reference.com

1926 births
1998 deaths
Serbian male long-distance runners
Olympic athletes of Yugoslavia
Athletes (track and field) at the 1952 Summer Olympics
Mediterranean Games bronze medalists for Yugoslavia
Athletes (track and field) at the 1951 Mediterranean Games
Mediterranean Games medalists in athletics